Red Languages is the debut EP of Dessau, self-released on October 1, 1985.

Track listing

Personnel
Adapted from the Red Languages liner notes.

Dessau
 John Elliott – instruments and vocals (A)

Additional performers
 Patrick Benson – drums (B1)
 Kim Ervin Elliott – voice (A)
 Kevin Hamilton – guitar (B1, B2)
 James Horn – bass guitar (B1, B2)
 Skot Nelson – guitar (A)
 Mike Orr – bass guitar (A)

Production and design
 Tom Der – assistant producer
 Martin Hannett – production
 Michel Kestemont – engineering
 Bobby Stewart – engineering
 Mark Wood – executive-producer

Release history

References

External links 
 Red Languages at Discogs (list of releases)

1985 debut EPs
Dessau (band) albums